The Screen Actors Guild Award for Outstanding Performance by a Cast (or Ensemble) in a Motion Picture is an award given by the Screen Actors Guild to honor the finest acting achievements in film. It is the final award presented during the ceremony.

Winners and nominees

1990s

2000s

2010s

2020s

Trivia

General
 The award was not given at the 1st Screen Actors Guild Awards.

Films
 The Full Monty, The Lord of the Rings: The Return of the King, and Parasite are the only winners not to be nominated in any other category.
 Gosford Park has the largest winning cast (20 credited actors).
 Bobby has the largest nominated cast (24 credited actors).
 Sideways has the smallest winning cast (4 credited actors).
 Million Dollar Baby and Beasts of No Nation have the smallest nominated cast (3 credited actors).
 Black Panther is the first superhero film to win the award.
 Parasite is the first non-English language film to win the award.
 Braveheart, The Shape of Water, Green Book, and Nomadland are the only films not to be nominated for the award and still go on to win the Academy Award for Best Picture
Two non-English language films have been nominated:
 Life Is Beautiful
 Parasite

 Eighteen nominated films not to be nominated in any other category:
 3:10 to Yuma
 Babylon
 Bobby
 Crazy Rich Asians
 Don't Look Up
 The Full Monty
 Get Shorty
 Hairspray
 How to Make an American Quilt
 Hustle & Flow
 In America
 The Lord of the Rings: The Return of the King
 The Lord of the Rings: The Two Towers
 Midnight in Paris
 My Big Fat Greek Wedding
 Parasite
 Straight Outta Compton
 Women Talking

Actors with the most nominations 
(Minimum of 5 nominations)

7 nominations
 Cate Blanchett
 Brad Pitt

6 nominations
 Russell Crowe
 Leonardo DiCaprio
 Meryl Streep

5 nominations
 Chris Cooper
 Judi Dench
 Philip Seymour Hoffman
 Allison Janney
 John C. Reilly
 Tom Wilkinson

Note:
 Cate Blanchett has the most consecutive nominations (four, from 2001 to 2004).
 Russell Crowe, Leonardo DiCaprio and Meryl Streep have the most nominations without ever winning (six each).

Actors with double nominations in one year
 Ed Harris (1995, won for Apollo 13)
 David Paymer (1995)
 John C. Reilly (2002, won for Chicago)
 Meryl Streep (2002)
 Christopher "Ludacris" Bridges (2005, won for Crash)
 Terrence Howard (2005, won for Crash)
 Martin Sheen (2006)
 Josh Brolin (2007, won for No Country for Old Men)
 Russell Crowe (2007)
 Benedict Cumberbatch (2013)
 Edward Norton (2014, won for Birdman)
 Mahershala Ali (2016, won for Hidden Figures)
 Janelle Monáe (2016, won for Hidden Figures)
 Lucas Hedges (2017, won for Three Billboards Outside Ebbing, Missouri)
 Caleb Landry Jones (2017, won for Three Billboards Outside Ebbing, Missouri)
 Al Pacino (2019)
 Margot Robbie (2019)
 Chadwick Boseman (2020)

Actors with multiple wins

3 wins
 Michael Keaton: Birdman (2014), Spotlight (2015),  The Trial of the Chicago 7 (2020)

2 wins
 Ben Affleck: Shakespeare in Love (1998), Argo (2012)
 Alan Arkin: Little Miss Sunshine (2006), Argo (2012)
 Christine Baranski: The Birdcage (1996), Chicago (2002)
 Don Cheadle: Traffic (2000), Crash (2005)
 Colin Firth: Shakespeare in Love (1998), The King's Speech (2010)
 Michael Gambon: Gosford Park (2001), The King's Speech (2010)
 Woody Harrelson: No Country for Old Men (2007), Three Billboards Outside Ebbing, Missouri (2017)
 Derek Jacobi: Gosford Park (2001), The King's Speech (2010)
 Allison Janney: American Beauty (1999), The Help (2011)
 Kelly Macdonald: Gosford Park (2001), No Country for Old Men (2007)
 Ryan Phillippe: Gosford Park (2001), Crash (2005)
 Geoffrey Rush: Shakespeare in Love (1998), The King's Speech (2010)
 Andy Serkis: The Lord of the Rings: The Return of the King (2003), Black Panther (2018)
 Octavia Spencer: The Help (2011), Hidden Figures (2016)
 Emma Stone: The Help (2011), Birdman (2014)
 Tom Wilkinson: The Full Monty (1997), Shakespeare in Love (1998)
 Catherine Zeta-Jones: Traffic (2000), Chicago (2002)

See also
 Academy Award for Best Picture
 Golden Globe Award for Best Motion Picture – Drama
 Golden Globe Award for Best Motion Picture – Musical or Comedy
 BAFTA Award for Best Film
 Critics' Choice Movie Award for Best Acting Ensemble
 Critics' Choice Movie Award for Best Picture
 Independent Spirit Award for Best Film

References

External links
 SAG Awards official site

Cast Motion Picture
 
Awards established in 1995
Film awards for Best Cast